Pataš is a village and municipality in the Dunajská Streda District in the Trnava Region of south-west Slovakia. The municipality also comprises Milinovice and Pásztómajor settlements. Between 1948 and 1991, the Slovak name of the village was Pastúchy.

The local agricultural co-operative survived the transition from communism to market-economy and is now one of the largest companies of the area.

History

The village was first recorded in 1268. For three centuries, the village had been possession of the Dominican convent on the Margaret Island but Gabriel Bethlen prince of Transylvania confiscated it in 1621.

On its outer area, there used to two other villages as well, Für (Fyur) and Zelebeg, destroyed during the Ottoman–Hungarian Wars. Until the end of World War I, it was part of Hungary and fell within the Tószigetcsilizköz district of Győr County. After the Austro-Hungarian army disintegrated in November 1918, Czechoslovak troops occupied the area. After the Treaty of Trianon of 1920, the village became officially part of Czechoslovakia. In 1923, as part of the Slovakization, 49 colonist families, mostly from Moravia, were settled into the village. In November 1938, the First Vienna Award granted the area to Hungary and it was held by Hungary until 1945. After the Soviet occupation in 1945, Czechoslovak administration returned and the village became officially part of Czechoslovakia in 1947.

Demography 
In 1910, the village had 700 inhabitants, mainly Hungarians.

At the 2001 Census the recorded population of the village was 805 while an end-2008 estimate by the Statistical Office had the village's population as 869. As of 2001, 89.69% of its population were Hungarians while 7.45% were Slovaks.

As of 2001, 64.96% of the inhabitants professed Protestantism, while the adherents of Roman Catholicism numbered 25.45% of the total population.

References

External links

Local news in Új Szó newspaper 

Villages and municipalities in Dunajská Streda District
Hungarian communities in Slovakia